Men's Baseball made its first appearance as a demonstration sport at the 1990. Baseball became a full medal sport at the 1994 Asian Games in Hiroshima, Japan, and has been a sport in the games since then.

Summary

Medal table

Participating nations

List of medalists

References

External links
Medallists from previous Asian Games - Baseball

 
Sports at the Asian Games
Asian Games
Asian Games